Monte Vidon Corrado is a comune (municipality) in the Province of Fermo in the Italian region Marche, located about  south of Ancona and about  northwest of Ascoli Piceno.

References

Cities and towns in the Marche